Hesmond is a commune in the Pas-de-Calais department in the Hauts-de-France region of France.

Geography
A village situated some 8 miles (13 km) east of Montreuil-sur-Mer on the D149E1 road and in the valley of the Créquoise river.

Population

Places of interest
 The church of St. Germain, dating from the sixteenth century.
 The eighteenth-century chateau

See also
Communes of the Pas-de-Calais department

References

External links

 Statistical data, INSEE

Communes of Pas-de-Calais